The Deccan Times is an english news portal based In India.

History 
The Deccan Times starting in 1938 by Naganachiketh Chinnamuttevi. The paper folded in December 1950.

References

External links
Official Website

1938 establishments in India
1950 disestablishments in India
Daily newspapers published in India
Defunct newspapers published in India
Defunct weekly newspapers
English-language newspapers published in India
Newspapers established in 1938
Newspapers published in Hyderabad
Publications disestablished in 1950
Weekly newspapers published in India